Robert Korbin Forrister (born November 16, 1992) is an American professional stock car racing driver. He last competed part-time in the NASCAR Gander RV & Outdoors Truck Series, driving the Nos. 7 and 17 Toyota Tundras for All Out Motorsports. In January 2021, he got caught for talking to minors inappropriately and since then, he hasn't made a single NASCAR start. In 2019, he got caught on social media mocking fellow driver Noah Gragson about his dad being arrested for murdering someone while drunk-driving.

Racing career

Forrister first started in dirt track racing, winning a track championship when he was nine. He also played baseball while in high school, but decided to pursue a full-time racing career upon graduating.

In 2012, Forrister attempted to make his stock car debut at Mobile International Speedway in the ARCA Racing Series for Lafferty Motorsports, but failed to qualify. He later made his debut at Toledo Speedway, driving the No. 68 for Kimmel Racing. After starting 27th, he finished 28th after suffering from clutch problems on lap 119. He attempted a total of nine races in 2012, only finishing once at Kansas Speedway. The following year, he ran four races, with a best finish of 14th at Mobile.

In 2014, Forrister made his Camping World Truck Series debut at Martinsville Speedway; after starting 34th, he finished 26th, 14 laps behind race winner Matt Crafton. He had a best finish of 15th at Phoenix International Speedway during the season. The following year, he joined SS-Green Light Racing to compete in 15 races. At Eldora Speedway, he began running a Donald Trump-based paint scheme to support Trump's 2016 presidential campaign, although the campaign was not sponsoring Forrister's team. During the race, Forrister struggled, spinning three times on laps 8, 27 and 149; he finished the race 24th, one lap down. Later in the year, he debuted in the Xfinity Series for SS-Green Light at Kansas Speedway, but crashed with Jennifer Jo Cobb and finished 31st. He made another Xfinity start at Phoenix, driving the No. 15 for Rick Ware Racing, and finished 32nd.

In 2016, Forrister joined Lira Motorsports to drive the No. 59 car at the Truck Series season opener in Daytona and Atlanta, along with running the ARCA race at Talladega Superspeedway. Forrister failed to qualify for the first two races in the Truck Series, but started 10th in the Talladega race and finished 27th at Talladega after The Big One.

On February 22, 2017, Forrister announced a full-season deal with Wauters Motorsports, piloting the No. 5. However, after Atlanta, the team shut down. He was later picked up by his former Truck Series team, SS-Green Light Racing, to run at Michigan and Daytona in the Xfinity Series. Forrister would run the No. 07 normally driven by Ray Black Jr. at Michigan, and the No. 99 normally driven by David Starr at Daytona. However, Forrister was out with the flu at Daytona and Starr ended up driving (Starr finished 5th).

For 2018, Forrister announced he would open up his own team in the Truck Series called All Out Motorsports. He would attempt 11 races on the schedule but failed to qualify for Charlotte due to a qualifying rainout. On July 12, Forrister earned his second-best finish of his career in the Truck Series with a 13th at Kentucky Speedway. He matched that with another 13th at Las Vegas later that year, and then again at Talladega in October 2019.

Forrister's team intended to run full-time in 2019, but plans were eventually scaled back starting with their withdrawal from the race at Kansas in May. After they returned for the next race at Charlotte, the team's crew chief, Wally Rogers, tweeted that the team had shut down. However, days later, Forrister himself rebuked those claims, but Rogers still left the team to go to Jordan Anderson Racing. All Out did not attempt any other races until Talladega in October 2019, where Forrister finished 13th and had a new crew chief in Danny Gill.

Forrister attempted 10 races in 2020, with Nursing Home Heroes and Nursing Home Caregivers sponsoring most races; he failed to qualify at Las Vegas Motor Speedway and withdrew at Kansas Speedway. He had a best finish of eighteenth at Daytona International Speedway and two DNFs. 

After not attempting the 2021 season opener at Daytona, Forrister has not raced since.

Motorsports career results

NASCAR
(key) (Bold – Pole position awarded by qualifying time. Italics – Pole position earned by points standings or practice time. * – Most laps led.)

Xfinity Series

Gander RV & Outdoors Truck Series

 Season still in progress
 Ineligible for series points

ARCA Racing Series
(key) (Bold – Pole position awarded by qualifying time. Italics – Pole position earned by points standings or practice time. * – Most laps led.)

References

External links
 
 

Living people
1992 births
People from Cedartown, Georgia
Sportspeople from the Atlanta metropolitan area
NASCAR drivers
ARCA Menards Series drivers
Racing drivers from Georgia (U.S. state)